Barbara Jo Walker Hummel (March 12, 1926 – June 7, 2000) was Miss America in 1947.

Life 
She attended the University of Memphis and is an alumna of Alpha Gamma Delta sorority. She is also the mother of the late Andy Hummel of the legendary Memphis-based power pop band Big Star.

She was the last Miss America to be crowned in her bathing suit; all since 1947 have been crowned in their evening gowns. Walker, was Miss Memphis, the last city representative to win the crown.

She died in Memphis, Tennessee, on June 7, 2000.

References

External links
 University of Memphis - Alpha Gamma Delta

1926 births
2000 deaths
Miss America 1940s delegates
Miss America winners
Miss America Preliminary Talent winners
Miss Tennessee winners
University of Memphis alumni
20th-century American people